Roberto Peragón Lacalle (born 7 February 1978) is a Spanish retired footballer who played as a striker.

He amassed Segunda División totals of 317 games and 62 goals over the course of ten seasons, representing seven clubs. In La Liga he competed for Rayo Vallecano, scoring ten goals in 70 matches.

Club career
After making his professional debut with hometown's Rayo Vallecano, with little impact, Madrid-born Peragón went on to represent Segunda División B clubs. In the 1999–2000 season he scored 17 goals for Burgos CF, and soon attracted the likes of Sevilla FC and Deportivo de La Coruña, eventually signing with Segunda División side Levante UD.

After another good year, Peragón rejoined Rayo Vallecano for two La Liga campaigns (plus 2003–04 in the second division), often contributing from the bench, then spent a further three years in division two with Elche CF. In his last year, he netted 11 times in the league.

In the summer of 2007, Peragón joined Málaga CF, and was a key attacking unit alongside veteran Salva and Nabil Baha for a side that returned to the top flight after a two-year absence. However, on 10 August 2008 he left the Andalusians as he was not part of new manager Antonio Tapia's plans; the following day the player signed a two-year contract with Alicante CF, recently promoted to the second tier as former team Rayo Vallecano.

After a sole season, with relegation, Peragón moved clubs again, joining Girona FC also of the second division.

References

External links

1978 births
Living people
Footballers from Madrid
Spanish footballers
Association football forwards
La Liga players
Segunda División players
Segunda División B players
Tercera División players
Rayo Vallecano B players
Rayo Vallecano players
CP Almería players
Burgos CF footballers
Levante UD footballers
Elche CF players
Málaga CF players
Alicante CF footballers
Girona FC players
Gimnàstic de Tarragona footballers
Cádiz CF players